was a Japanese boxer who competed in the 1932 Summer Olympics.

In 1932 he was eliminated in the first round of the featherweight class after losing his fight to the upcoming bronze medalist Allan Carlsson.

External links
Katsuo Kameoka's profile at Sports Reference.com

References

1905 births
1945 deaths
Featherweight boxers
Olympic boxers of Japan
Boxers at the 1932 Summer Olympics
Japanese male boxers
People from Fukushima Prefecture
Sportspeople from Fukushima Prefecture